Bekir Rasim (born 26 December 1994) is a Bulgarian footballer who played as a midfielder for Pomorie.

Career 
Born in Varna, Rasim was raised in small village Medovets, Dalgopol Municipality. He joined the Cherno More Academy at the age of fourteen in 2008. Since his childhood Rasim became known with many football ideas on the pitch, excellent passes and direct free kicks. Through these qualities the Cherno More fans gave him the nickname—"the painter", because the Arabic name "Rasim" means painter.

He made his first team début in a 2-0 league home win against Slavia on 23 May 2012, coming on as a substitute for Hristian Popov.

His contract with Cherno More was terminated by mutual consent on 4 July 2016 and he subsequently joined Pomorie in the B PFG.

Statistics

Honours

Club
Cherno More
 Bulgarian Cup: 2014–15

References

External links

1994 births
Living people
Bulgarian footballers
Bulgaria youth international footballers
Bulgarian people of Turkish descent
Association football midfielders
PFC Cherno More Varna players
FC Pomorie players
First Professional Football League (Bulgaria) players